Thomas Burgh (1696 – 20 September 1758) was an Anglo-Irish politician who was elected MP for Lanesborough in the Irish House of Commons (1727–1758).

Biography
Burgh was educated at Trinity College, Dublin.

He was the son of William Burgh of Bert House, near Athy, County Kildare, Comptroller and Auditor General, and Margaret Parnell, sister of the High Court judge John Parnell and the poet and preacher Thomas Parnell. His uncle, John, was an ancestor of the leading statesman Charles Stewart Parnell. Burgh sat in the Irish House of Commons as the Member of Parliament for Lanesborough between 1727 and his death in 1758.

Family 
Burgh married Anne Downes, daughter of Rt. Rev. Dive Downes, Bishop of Cork and Ross and his fourth wife Lady Catherine Fitzgerald, sister of the Earl of Kildare, in 1731. They had eight children, three sons and five daughters. 

One of their daughters, Margaretta Burgh, married John Foster, 1st Baron Oriel and was created Viscountess Ferrard in 1797. Another, Catherine, married Dixie Coddington MP of Oldbridge, County Meath, but had no surviving issue. 

One of their sons, also called Thomas, was the father of Ulysses Burgh, 2nd Baron Downes, who inherited the title by special remainder from his cousin William Downes, 1st Baron Downes, Lord Chief Justice of Ireland, a nephew of Anne Downes. Bert House, a substantial Palladian mansion, still exists.

References

1696 births
1758 deaths
18th-century Anglo-Irish people
Thomas
Irish MPs 1727–1760
Members of the Parliament of Ireland (pre-1801) for County Longford constituencies
Alumni of Trinity College Dublin